Switched at Birth was renewed for a fifth season by Freeform in October 2015. In March 2016, it was confirmed that this ten-episode season would be its last. The fifth season premiered on January 31, 2017.

The one-hour scripted drama revolves around two young women who discover they were switched at birth and grew up in very different environments.  While balancing school, jobs, and their unconventional family, the girls, along with their friends and family, experience Deaf culture, relationships, class differences, racism, audism, and other social issues.

Cast

Main
Lucas Grabeel as Toby Kennish
Katie Leclerc as Daphne Vasquez-Kennish
Vanessa Marano as Bay Kennish-Vasquez
Constance Marie as Regina Vasquez
D. W. Moffett as John Kennish
Lea Thompson as Kathryn Kennish

Recurring
Sean Berdy as Emmett Bledsoe
Bianca Bethune as Sharee Gifford
Marlee Matlin as Melody Bledsoe
Ryan Lane as Travis Barnes
Rachel Shenton as Lily Summers
Adam Hagenbuch as Greg "Mingo" Shimingo
Sharon Pierre-Louis as Iris Watkins
Rana Roy as Vimla
Alice Lee as Skye

Episodes

Reception

U.S. ratings

References

External links

2017 American television seasons
Switched at Birth (TV series)